Shorea induplicata is a species of plant in the family Dipterocarpaceae. It is a tree endemic to Borneo.

References

induplicata
Endemic flora of Borneo
Trees of Borneo
Taxonomy articles created by Polbot